Hakea ochroptera is a species of flowering plant in the family Proteaceae and is endemic to a restricted area of New South Wales. It is a shrub with long, needle-shaped leaves and an abundance of cream-white flowers in spring.

Description
Young stems, leaves and pedicels are hairy and rusty coloured. Creamy-white flowers appear in umbels of up to six flowers in the leaf axils from September to October.

Taxonomy and naming
Hakea ochroptera was first formally described in 1996 by South Australian botanist William Barker and the description was published in the Journal of the Adelaide Botanic Gardens. The specific epithet (ochroptera) "derives from the Greek, ochros, yellow, and pteron, wing, alluding to an important diagnostic difference from H. macraeana".

Distribution and habitat
This hakea is found near Dorrigo in northern New South Wales where it grows in shallow soil on hillsides on rock in light scrub or depauperate warm-temperate rainforest.

References

ochroptera
Flora of New South Wales
Plants described in 1996
Taxa named by William Robert Barker